The computing sector, like other STEM fields, lacks diversity in the United States. The lack of diversity is caused by two issues:

1. Pipeline: the lack of early access to resources 

2. Culture: exclusivity and discrimination in the workplace  

As technology is becoming omnipresent, diversity in the tech field could help institutions reduce inequalities in society.  To make the field more diverse, organizations need to address both issues.

Statistics 
While women represent 50.8% of the total population of the United States, they make up only 25.6% of computer and mathematical occupations and 27% of computer and information systems manager occupations. African Americans represent 13.4% of the population, but hold 8.4% of computer and mathematical occupations. Hispanic or Latino people make up 18.3% of the population, but constitute only 7.5% of the people in these jobs. Meanwhile, white people are 60.4%-76.5% of the population of the United States, and represent 67% of computer and mathematical occupations and 77% of computer and information systems manager occupations. Asians, representing 5.9% of the population, hold 22% of computer and mathematical jobs and are 14.3% of all computer and information systems managers.

Factors contributing to underrepresentation 
There are two reported reasons for the lack of participation of women and minorities in the computing sector. The first reason is the lack of early exposure to resources like computers, internet connections and experiences such as computer courses.   Research shows that the digital divide acts as a factor; students who do not already have computer skills upon entering college are at a disadvantage in computing majors, and access to computers is influenced by demographics, such as ethnic background. The problem of lack of resources is compounded with lack of exposure to courses and information that can lead to a successful computing career. A survey of students at University of Maryland Eastern Shore and Howard University, two historically black universities, found that the majority of students were not "counseled about computer related careers" either before or during college. The same study (this time only surveying UMES students) found that fewer women than men had learned about computers and programming in high school. The researchers have concluded that these factors could contribute to lower numbers of women and minorities choosing to pursue computing degrees.

Another reported issue that leads to the homogeneity of the computing sector is the cultural issue of discrimination at the workplace and how minorities are treated. For participants to excel in a tech-related course or career, their sense of belonging matters more than pre-gained knowledge. That was reflected in “The Great Resignation” that took place in the US during the COVID-19 pandemic. In a survey of 2,030 workers between the ages of 18 and 28 conducted in July 2021, the company found that 50% said they had left or wanted to their leave tech or IT job “because the company culture made them feel unwelcome or uncomfortable,” with a higher percentage of women and Asian, Black, and Hispanic respondents each saying they had such an experience. In most cases, the workplaces not only lack a sense of belonging but are also unsafe. Research conducted by Dice, a tech career hub, showed that more than 50% of women faced sexual harassment in tech companies. A pilot program that was done to understand different elements that affect minorities during a STEM course showed that increased mentorship and support was an important factor for the completion of the course.

Increasing diversity 

Institutions working to improve diversity in the computing sector are focusing on increasing access to resources and building a sense of belonging for minorities.  One organization working toward this goal is EarSketch, an educational coding program that allows users to produce music by coding in JavaScript and Python. Its aim is to spark interest in programming and computer science for a wider range of students and "to attract different demographics, especially girls." The nonprofit Black Girls Code is working to encourage and empower black girls and girls of color to enter the world of computing by teaching them how to code. Another way to widen access to resources is by increasing equality in access to computers. Students who use computers in school settings are more likely to use them outside the classroom, so bringing computers into the classroom improves students' computer literacy.

Since workplace discrimination causes lack of diversity in STEM, changing that would increase diversity in the sector. Big tech companies like Microsoft and Facebook are publishing diversity reports and investing in programs to make their companies more diverse.

See also

 Gender disparity in computing
 Association for Computing Machinery
 Black Girls Code
 Coalition to Diversify Computing
 STEM pipeline
 Women in computing
 EarSketch
Carrie Anne Philbin

References

External links
Coalition for Cultural Diversity 
UK Coalition for Cultural Diversity
Black Girls Code website
Computer science’s diversity gap starts early
More Students—But Few Girls, Minorities—Took AP Computer Science Exams
AP Archived Data 2014
 Top and Bottom Five States for Minorities in Computing

 
Computer science education